Veyil may refer to:

Veyil (2006 film), Indian Tamil-language drama film
Veyil (2022 film), Indian Malayalam-language drama film